Eglin may refer to:

 Eglin (surname)
 Eglin Air Force Base, a United States Air Force base located southwest of Valparaiso, Florida
 Federal Prison Camp, Eglin, a Federal Bureau of Prisons minimum security prison on the grounds of Eglin Air Force Base
 Eglin steel, a high-strength, high-performance, low-alloy, low-cost steel

See also
 Elgin (disambiguation)